David Pedersen (born May 15, 1986 in Andenes, Vesterålen) is a Norwegian singer and came in 3rd place on Idol in 2003. The next year David was asked to join the band Carnival. The band only released one single before disbanding in late 2006.

Discography
Albums:
 Wild at Heart (2003)

Singles:
 Wild at Heart (2003)
 What the Hell (2003)
 For Your Eyes Only (2005) - with Carnival

Norwegian Idol 2003 Performances
Audition: "Kryptonite" 3 Doors Down
Top 50: "With Arms Wide Open" by Creed 
Top 10: "Kryptonite" 3 Doors Down
Top 9: "Drømmedame" by Trang Fødsel 
Top 8:  "Heaven" by Bryan Adams
Top 7:  "Don't Let The Sun Go Down On Me" by Elton John 
Top 6:  "Play That Funky Music" by Wild Cherry 
Top 5:  "Ain't That A Kick In The Head" by Dean Martin 
Top 4:  "Lemon Tree" by Fool's Garden 
Top 4:  "Velvet" by Savoy 
Top 3:  "Wherever You Will Go" by The Calling 
Top 3:  "Dancing In The Moonlight" by Toploader

References

1986 births
Living people
People from Andøy
Idol (Norwegian TV series) participants
21st-century Norwegian singers
21st-century Norwegian male singers